Dalibor Kusovsky is a Slovak professional ice hockey player who played with HC Slovan Bratislava in the Slovak Extraliga.

Career statistics

References

External links

Living people
1971 births
HC Slovan Bratislava players
Slovak ice hockey defencemen
MsHK Žilina players
MHk 32 Liptovský Mikuláš players
HK Dukla Trenčín players
Czechoslovak ice hockey defencemen